

Place names
In the United States:
Ricketts, Iowa
Ricketts Glen State Park in Pennsylvania

People
Anthony Ricketts (b. 1979), former professional squash player
Arthur Ricketts, (1913–2000), English cricketer
Bertha Louise Ricketts, original name of Cid Ricketts Sumner (1890–1970), American novelist
Charles Ricketts (1876–1931), artist/illustrator
Charles Spencer Ricketts (1788?-1867), commander
Claude V. Ricketts (1906–1964), United States naval admiral
Donovan Ricketts (b. 1977), Jamaican footballer, goalkeeper with Los Angeles Galaxy
Ed Ricketts (1897–1948), literary figure and marine biologist
Hermine E. Ricketts (1956–2019), Jamaican-born American architect
Howard Taylor Ricketts (1871–1910), American pathologist
Joe Ricketts (b. 1941), brokerage founder, billionaire
James B. Ricketts (1817–1887), American Civil War general
Juan Landázuri Ricketts (1913–1997), cardinal from Peru
L. D. Ricketts (1859–1940), geologist, mining engineer and banker, namesake of Caltech's Ricketts House
Laura Ricketts, co-owner of the Chicago Cubs, gay rights activist, daughter of Joe Ricketts
Mark Scott Ricketts (b. 1957), Comics Writer and Artist
Dr. Matthew Ricketts (–), first African American to be elected to the Nebraska legislature, 1892
Michael Ricketts (b. 1978), English footballer
Milton Ernest Ricketts (1913–1942), United States Navy Lieutenant and Medal of Honor recipient.
Palmer C. Ricketts (1856–1934), mechanical engineer, President of Rensselaer Polytechnic Institute, 1901 – 1934
Pete Ricketts (b. 1964), U.S. politician
Sir Peter Forbes Ricketts, senior British diplomat
R. Bruce Ricketts (1839-1918), artillery officer in the American Civil War
Robert M. Ricketts (1920-2003), US orthodontist
Rohan Ricketts (b. 1982), English soccer player
Sam Ricketts (b. 1981), Welsh footballer
Tosaint Ricketts (b. 1987), Canadian footballer
Thomas Ricketts (1901–1967), youngest recipient of the Victoria Cross
Thomas S. Ricketts, investment bank CEO
William Reynolds Ricketts (1869–1956), philatelist, of Forty Fort, Pennsylvania

Vessels

Others 

 Ricketts baronets, Baronetcy in the Baronetage of the United Kingdom

See also
Rickets, a medical condition with softening of the bones